The American Society of Preventive Oncology is a multidisciplinary professional society dedicated to cancer prevention and control research. It was established in 1976. The society contributes 48 pages per year to the Journal Cancer Epidemiology, Biomarkers & Prevention published by the American Association for Cancer Research.

In 1992, the society established the Cullen Memorial Award, named after Joseph W. Cullen, which is given at each of their annual meetings to an individual who has made distinguished achievements in tobacco control. Ellen Gritz was the award's first recipient.

The society has eight special interest groups: Behavioral Science & Health Communication; Lifestyles Behavior, Energy Balance & Chemoprevention; Molecular Epidemiology & the Environment; Early Detection & Risk Prediction of Cancer; Cancer Health Disparities; Survivorship & Health Outcomes; Junior Investigators; and International Issues in Cancer. Since 2017 ASPO has hosted monthly webinars led by the special interest groups.

The society has held an annual scientific conference for 44 years. The 44th of these conferences was held virtually in response to the Covid-19 pandemic. The 45th Annual Meeting of the American Society of Preventive Oncology will be held in Tucson, Arizona, in 2021.

References

External links
 

Cancer organizations based in the United States
Learned societies of the United States
Organizations established in 1976
1976 establishments in the United States
Organizations based in Indianapolis
Medical associations based in the United States
Medical and health organizations based in Indiana